Godstow Lock is a lock on the River Thames in Oxfordshire, England. It is between the villages of Wolvercote and Wytham on the outskirts of Oxford. The first lock was built of stone by Daniel Harris for the Thames Navigation Commission in 1790. It is the lock furthest upstream on the river which has mechanical (electro-hydraulic) operation - every lock upstream of Godstow utilises manual beam operation instead.

The main weir is a short way upstream but there is another weir at Godstow Bridge just above the Trout Inn. These feed into a backwater (Wolvercote Mill Stream) which has come from above King's Lock by Wolvercote.

History
Prior to the construction of the lock, Godstow Bridge served as a form of lock, which remained in service for some time after the construction of Godstow Lock in 1790. After the lock was constructed there were complaints about the raising of the water levels and the effect this had on the meadows upstream at Pixey Mead. After some years of dilapidation, the lock underwent major repair in 1872. River users would often avoid the lock by navigating up the stream past Wolvercote. The lock house was built around 1896 on condition that it sold no refreshments to protect the interests of The Trout Inn. Previously the lock-keeper had lived on a houseboat. The lock was last rebuilt in 1924.

Access to the lock
The lock is a short way from Godstow Bridge and can be reached on foot from there.

Reach above the lock
Beside the lock at Godstow are the ruins of Godstow Nunnery. Above the lock, the river is crossed by Godstow Bridge and the A34 Road Bridge carrying the Oxford By-pass. Upstream of Godstow the river becomes narrower and more winding as it passes Pixey Mead.

The Thames Path continues on the western side to King's Lock.

Literature and the media
In the meadows near the lock, an Oxford mathematics tutor Charles Lutwidge Dodgson used to have picnics with his friend Dean Henry Liddell and his daughters Lorina, Alice and Edith. Here he made up a story which began

See also
 Locks on the River Thames

Sources

External links 
 Godstow Lock at riverthames.co.uk
 Picture of Godstow Lock at geograph.org.uk

References

1790 establishments in England
Buildings and structures completed in 1924
Locks on the River Thames
Locks of Oxfordshire
Buildings and structures in Oxford
Transport in Oxford